Euseius wyebo is a species of mite in the family Phytoseiidae.

References

wyebo
Articles created by Qbugbot
Animals described in 1992